Fry was a Formula Two constructor from the United Kingdom. The team was founded by David Fry and Alec Issigonis, whose previous employer John Parkes at Alvis brought his son Mike Parkes as a development driver.

The Fry F2 made its début appearance in June 1958 at Brands Hatch, with Parkes finishing its first race sixth at the Crystal Palace circuit. Appearing in a number of Formula Two events throughout 1958 and 1959, the car was entered for the Formula One 1959 British Grand Prix. Parkes did not qualify for the race, setting the 27th fastest time, and the car was not entered for another World Championship Grand Prix. The car participated in several more races, before the final appearance with a second-place finish at the Brands Hatch Boxing Day event.

Complete Formula One World Championship results
(key)

References 
 Results from Formula1.com

Formula One constructors
Formula One entrants
British auto racing teams
British racecar constructors
Auto racing teams established in 1958
Auto racing teams disestablished in 1959